John E. Cole (born 4 August 1942) was a Progressive Conservative party member of the House of Commons of Canada. He was an optometrist by career.

He represented the Ontario riding of York—Simcoe where he was elected in the 1988 federal election and served in the 34th Canadian Parliament. Cole left federal politics in the 1993 federal election after his loss to Karen Kraft Sloan of the Liberal party.

Electoral results

References
 

1942 births
Living people
Canadian optometrists
Members of the House of Commons of Canada from Ontario
Politicians from Toronto
Progressive Conservative Party of Canada MPs